Bipectilus zhejiangensis is a species of moth of the family Hepialidae. It is found in Zhejiang, China.

References

Moths described in 2001
Hepialidae